Nils-Eric Gustaf Ekblad (12 November 1904 – 25 August 1978) was a Swedish diplomat.

Early life
Ekblad was born on 12 November 1904 in Lund, Sweden, the son of Erik Ekblad, a headmaster, and his wife Gustava (née Jönsson). When he was fifteen years old in 1920 he passed studentexamen and enrolled at the Lund University. He earned a Bachelor of Arts in 1922, became a reserve officer in 1924 and earned a Candidate of Law in 1928 before being recruited by the Ministry for Foreign Affairs as an attaché the same year.

Career
He served in Chicago in 1929, was acting second secretary of legation in Riga, Tallinn and Kaunas 1931, attaché in Bern in 1934, and vice consul in Omaha in 1935. Ekblad was then vice consul and trade attaché in Copenhagen in 1937, first vice consul in 1938 and became first secretary of legation in 1939. In 1939 he received the rank of captain and became head of the department at the Swedish National Board of Information (Statens Informationsstyrelse) . He became director in 1941, was counsellor and chargé d'affaires in Caracas from 1943 to 1948, in Addis Ababa from 1948 to 1950 before he was back and served at the Foreign Ministry from 1950 to 1952. Ekblad became consul in Hamburg in 1952 and was consul general there from 1954 to 1960 before he was ambassador in Canberra from 1960 to 1963, in Dublin from 1963 to 1967, and in Tehran from 1967 to 1970 with dual accreditation to Kabul.

Under the pseudonym of 'Spectator', he and Gunnar Unger published the brochure Svenskarna och propagandan: har Gallup rätt? ("The Swedes and the propaganda: is Gallup right?") (1943). Eblad was the chairman of the National Information Board's Advertising Council 1940–1943, its Film Council 1942–1943, deputy chairman of the Stockholm Advertising Association 1942–1943 and board member of the Swedish Advertising Association from 1942 to 1943.

Personal life
In 1931 he married the dentist Märta Granström (1905–1976), daughter of the wholesaler Carl Granström and Cecilia Frykblom. He was the father of Marie-Louise (born 1933) and Ulla-Mae (born 1937).

Death
Ekblad died on 25 August 1978 and was buried at the Northern Cemetery in Lund. By the time of his death Ekblad resided in Algarve, Portugal.

Awards and decorations
Ekblads awards:

Commander of Order of the Polar Star. 1st class (1967)
Knight 1st Class of Order of Vasa (1941)
Grand Officer of the Order of the Bust of Bolivar
Commander of the Order of the Dannebrog
Commander of the Order of the Three Stars
Third Class of the Order of the White Star
First Class Knight of the Order of the White Rose of Finland
Officer of the Order of the Lithuanian Grand Duke Gediminas
Officer of the Order of Orange-Nassau
Knight of the Order of St. Olav
Grand Cross of the Order of Merit of the Federal Republic of Germany
King Christian X's Liberty Medal
Commemorative Medal on the occasion of the second Lingiad (Minnesmedalj med anledning av andra Lingiaden) (1949)
Southern Journalist Association's badge of merit in gold (Södra journalistförbundets förtjänsttecken i guld)

References

1904 births
1978 deaths
Consuls-general of Sweden
Ambassadors of Sweden to Australia
Ambassadors of Sweden to Ireland
Ambassadors of Sweden to Iran
Ambassadors of Sweden to Afghanistan
People from Lund
Lund University alumni
Commanders of the Order of the Polar Star
Knights First Class of the Order of Vasa
Commanders of the Order of the Dannebrog
Officer's Crosses of the Order of the Lithuanian Grand Duke Gediminas
Officers of the Order of Orange-Nassau
Grand Crosses 1st class of the Order of Merit of the Federal Republic of Germany